Marcos "Marc" Eusebio Jiménez de la Espada Martín (born 3 November 1985) is a Spanish footballer who plays as a striker for UD Poblense.

Club career
Born in Pollença, Majorca, Balearic Islands, Jiménez was a trainee of both SD La Salle and CD San Francisco, and made his senior debut with CE Constància in 2004–05, in Tercera División. He competed at that level the following three seasons, representing RCD Mallorca B and UE Sant Andreu.

In July 2008, Jiménez was loaned to Segunda División B club Orihuela CF. He subsequently returned to the Catalans, with the team now in the same division.

Jiménez moved to CF Sporting Mahonés also of the third tier in July 2010, and started in all his appearances in his only season to help to a 15th-place finish. On 15 July 2011, he rejoined Sant Andreu for a third spell.

On 26 June 2012, Jiménez signed for Gimnàstic de Tarragona, recently relegated to division three. He scored 17 goals in his debut campaign, with his side ranking sixth.

After achieving promotion to Segunda División, Jiménez renewed his contract with Nàstic for a further year on 29 June 2015. He made his professional debut on 23 August (two months shy of his 30th birthday), coming on as a second-half substitute for Mossa in a 2–2 home draw against Albacete Balompié; he also scored the last goal through a penalty.

On 23 June 2016, after narrowly missing another promotion, Jiménez was released as his contract was due to expire. He resumed his career in the Hong Kong Premier League, with Kitchee SC and Southern District FC.

Jiménez joined East Bengal F.C. of the Indian I-League on 6 August 2019. He returned to his country and its third tier one year later, agreeing to a one-year deal at CE L'Hospitalet. 

In July 2021, Jiménez signed for CE Andratx in the newly-created Segunda División RFEF.

Personal life
Jiménez was a member of the Hipster subculture, distinguishing himself with a thick beard and a long hair.

Career statistics

References

External links

1985 births
Living people
Spanish footballers
Footballers from Mallorca
Association football forwards
Segunda División players
Segunda División B players
Tercera División players
Segunda Federación players
Tercera Federación players
CE Constància players
RCD Mallorca B players
UE Sant Andreu footballers
Orihuela CF players
CF Sporting Mahonés players
Gimnàstic de Tarragona footballers
CD Atlético Baleares footballers
CE L'Hospitalet players
Hong Kong Premier League players
Kitchee SC players
Southern District FC players
I-League players
East Bengal Club players
Spanish expatriate footballers
Expatriate footballers in Hong Kong
Expatriate footballers in India
Spanish expatriate sportspeople in Hong Kong
Spanish expatriate sportspeople in India
CE Andratx footballers